Joel Bogen (born 3 September 1958) is an English rock and punk guitarist.  He worked with Toyah Willcox from the late 1970s to 1983 as the guitar player in her eponymous band and was the co-writer on nearly all of the material they recorded. Bogen also produced Heaven, the 1997 debut album of neo soul artist Jai, for M&G and RCA Records.

References 

1958 births
Living people
English songwriters
English rock guitarists
English male guitarists
Toyah (band) members
British male songwriters